is a Japanese fashion producer and tarento, represented by Sun Music Production. She is a former member of the Japanese idol girl group AKB48 and the founder of the fashion label Haluhiroine, which is distributed through Earth Music & Ecology.

Career 
Kojima passed AKB48's 14th generation auditions in 2012. On July 20, Kojima was announced to be in a new sub-unit, Tentoumu Chu!, consisting of trainee members from AKB48 and its sister groups, together with Nana Okada, Miki Nishino, Ryoha Kitagawa, Nagisa Shibuya, Meru Tashima and Mio Tomonaga. The sub-unit debuted on July 31. She was selected to perform in a single title song for the first time for the song "Mae Shika Mukanee" (2014). She was shuffled to Team K during AKB48's Daisosaku Matsuri.

On April 6, 2017, Kojima transferred talent agencies from AKS, which managed AKB48 and most of its members, to Sun Music Production. She participated in the reality show Produce 48 in 2018, but was eliminated in episode 8.

On January 12, 2019, Kojima announced her graduation from AKB48 during a Team K concert at Tokyo Dome City Hall. On April 27, her graduation ceremony was held during the AKB48 Group Spring LIVE Festival in Yokohama Stadium. On May 12, her final performance was held at the AKB48 Theater. She also announced the launch of her own clothing brand, which name is a combination of the Finnish word for "desire" (halu) and the English word "heroine".

Discography

AKB48 singles

AKB48 Albums
 Tsugi no Ashiato
 Team Zaka
 Smile Kamikakushi
 Koko ga Rhodes da, Koko de Tobe!
 Conveyor
 Bokutachi no Ideology

Appearances

Stage units
AKB48 Kenkyusei Stage 
 
 
 
AKB48 Kenkyusei Stage 
 
 
Team 4 2nd Stage 
 
Team K "RESET" (Revival)

TV variety
 AKBingo! (2013–2018)
  (2014)

TV dramas
  (2013)
  (2015), Kamisori

References

External links
Sun Music official profile  
makochannel
haluhiroine online store 

1997 births
Living people
Japanese idols
Japanese women pop singers
Singers from Tokyo
AKB48 members
Japanese fashion designers
Produce 48 contestants
21st-century Japanese singers
21st-century Japanese women singers
Japanese women fashion designers